Estadio de São Miguel is a multi-use stadium in Gondomar, Portugal.  It is currently used mostly for football matches and is the home stadium of Gondomar SC. The stadium is able to hold 2,450 people. 2,500 if you count with the stairs. It's a pretty big club in the região, but força Sporting.

Sao Miguel
Sports venues in Porto District
Buildings and structures in Gondomar, Portugal
Sport in Gondomar, Portugal